The Flyweight competition was the second-lightest class featured at the 2011 World Amateur Boxing Championships, held at the Heydar Aliyev Sports and Exhibition Complex.

Medalists

Seeds

  Misha Aloyan (champion)  Nordine Oubaali (third round)  Ronny Beblik (second round)  Rau'shee Warren (semifinals)  Khalid Yafai (quarterfinals)  Vincenzo Picardi (quarterfinals)  Fernando Martínez (second round)  Elvin Mamishzade (quarterfinals)  Tugstsogt Nyambayar (third round)  Andrew Selby (runner-up)  Chang Yong (first round)  Gilbert Bactora (first round)''

Draw

Finals

Top half

Section 1

Section 2

Bottom half

Section 3

Section 4

External links
Draw

Flyweight